Maria Rita Kehl, ORB (born December 10, 1951) is a Brazilian psychoanalyst, journalist, poet, essayist, cronista and literary critic. In 2010, she won the Jabuti Award in the Education, Psychology and Psychoanalysis category  and the Human Rights Award from the Brazilian government in the Media and Human Rights category.

Life and career 
Kehl was born in Campinas, São Paulo. She graduated in psychology from the University of São Paulo, and started writing for  while still in college. She worked for the newspaper managed by writer Raduan Nassar for two years. She was editor for the alternative newspaper , critical of the Brazilian military regime.

Kehl also participated in the foundation of newspaper  and wrote as a freelancer for Veja, Isto É, Folha de S. Paulo and O Estado de S. Paulo.

In 1979, Kehl began her master's degree in social psychology and wrote the dissertation "".  In 1981, Kehl started attending patients. In 1997, she received her doctorate in psychoanalysis at PUC-SP. The research resulted in the book  in 1998. Kehl has written several books and articles in the areas of literature, culture, and psychoanalysis.

In 2012, she was invited to participate in the National Truth Commission, which was installed on May 16 to investigate human rights violations which had occurred in Brazil between September 18, 1946 and October 5, 1988.

Published works 

  (Editora Estação Liberdade, 1996)
  (Imago Editora, 1996)
  (Imago Editora, 1998)
  (Relume Dumará, 2000)
  (Companhia das Letras, 2000)
  (Casa do psicólogo, 2004)
 , co-written by Eugênio Bucci (Boitempo Editorial, 2004)
  (Editora Olho d'Água, 2008)
  (Boitempo Editorial, 2010), translated in English as Time and the Dog  (Verso Books, 2018) 
  (Boitempo Editorial, 2011)

References

External links 
 Official site (in Portuguese)

Brazilian human rights activists
Brazilian literary critics
Women literary critics
Brazilian essayists
Living people
1951 births
Brazilian psychiatrists
People from Campinas
Brazilian women poets
University of São Paulo alumni
Pontifical Catholic University of São Paulo alumni
20th-century Brazilian physicians
20th-century Brazilian poets
20th-century Brazilian women writers
21st-century Brazilian physicians
21st-century Brazilian poets
21st-century Brazilian women writers